Piloderma is a genus of fungi in the family Atheliaceae. The distinguishing characteristics of Piloderma are the thick-walled (roughly 0.25 µm) basidiospores, the club-shaped basidia with stalk-like bases, and the clampless-septate hyphae. The widespread genus contains six species.

Ecology 
Piloderma is known to be a key ectomycorrhizal species in conifer forests, assisting in nitrogen recycling and assimilation.

References

External links 

Atheliales
Taxa named by Walter Jülich
Fungi described in 1969